is a passenger railway station in the city of Funabashi, Chiba, Japan, operated by the private railway operator Tōbu Railway. The station is numbered "TD-32".

Lines

Station layout
The station consists of two opposed elevated side platforms serving two tracks, with the station located at ground level underneath.

Platforms

Adjacent stations

History
It changed its name to its present name on 1 April 1924. The current station building dates from 1980. From 17 March 2012, station numbering was introduced on all Tobu lines, with Magomezawa Station becoming "TD-32".

Passenger statistics
In fiscal 2019, the station was used by an average of 26,529 passengers daily.

Surrounding area
Magomezawa Station is located in a residential area.

See also
 List of railway stations in Japan

References

External links

Tōbu Railway Station information 

Railway stations in Japan opened in 1923
Railway stations in Chiba Prefecture
Tobu Noda Line
Stations of Tobu Railway
Funabashi